The Wangerin Organ Company (1912-1942) was a manufacturer of pipe organs based in Milwaukee, Wisconsin. It was a continuation of the company after the partnership of Adolph Wangerin and George J. Weickhardt, Wangerin-Weickhardt, ended with the death of Weickhardt in 1919. It had previously also been known as the Hann-Wangerin-Weickhardt company. Many of its organs are still played in churches today.

During the theater organ boom in the 1920s, when the Barton Organ Company of Oshkosh, Wisconsin could not keep up with the production demand, the Wangerin factory first loaned them factory space, and later was sub-contracted to build organs for them.

During World War II, when manufacture of musical instruments was banned in 1942 in order to focus on the war effort, the Wangerin-Weickhardt Company built wooden airplane parts and other war-related goods. The firm did not resume organ building after the war, so it effectively ceased operation as an organ builder in 1942.

Some Wangerin organ locations
 St. Mary of the Immaculate Conception Catholic Church (Portage, Wisconsin)
 Holy Cross Church (Kaukauna, Wisconsin)
 Madison Masonic Center (Madison, Wisconsin) - 1925
 Freeport Masonic Temple (Freeport, Illinois) - 1928 two small organs (two manual 9 stop) and one large organ (3 manual, 32 stop)
 Praise Church (Beaver Dam, Wisconsin)
 St. Anthony Roman Catholic Church (Milwaukee, Wisconsin) (Schuelke/Wangerin/Erickson)
 Saint John's Evangelical Lutheran Church (Milwaukee, Wisconsin) (Barckhoff/Wangerin)
 St. Lucas Evangelical Lutheran Church (Milwaukee, Wisconsin) (Schuelke/Wangerin/Verlinden/Sipe)
 St. Peter's Evangelical Lutheran Church (Milwaukee, Wisconsin) (Wangerin, 1913 / Verlinden, 1949)
 St. Stephen Lutheran Church (Milwaukee, Wisconsin)
 St. John's United Church of Christ (Monroe, Wisconsin) - 1923
 Mosinee United Methodist Church (Mosinee, Wisconsin) - 1928
 Sacred Heart Catholic Church (Dubuque, Iowa)
 Saint Joseph's Catholic Church (Mason City, Iowa)
 Saint Peter's Evangelical Lutheran Church (St. Peter, Minnesota) - 1939 (Replaced in 1983 by J. Walker Organ from Essex, England) The Walker organ was subsequently damaged in the 1998 tornado and it was sent back to Walker to be rebuilt.  As of 2014 it stands in the balcony of the new church built following the tornado.  The pedal division, formerly at the floor behind the swell, is now elevated to provide a walkway behind the organ.
 St. Vibiana's Cathedral (Los Angeles)  Parts of this instrument were incorporated into the new organ by Dobson in the present Cathedral.
 St. Louis Catholic Church (Caledonia, Wisconsin)
 Wesley United Methodist Church (Ottumwa, Iowa)
 St. John's Lutheran Church (Woodstock, Illinois)
 St. Peter's Evangelical Lutheran Church (Indianapolis, Indiana)
 St Mary's Church (Fond du Lac, Wisconsin)
 St Mary's Church (Menasha, Wisconsin)
 St. Louis Catholic Church (Washburn, Wisconsin)
 St. Michael Catholic Church (Fort Loramie, Ohio)
 St. Lukes Episcopal Church (Hastings, Minnesota)
 St. John's Evangelical Lutheran Church (Tolleston, Indiana)/(Gary, Indiana)
 St. Peters Lutheran Church (Hilbert, Wisconsin)
 Immanuel Lutheran Church LCMS (Spring Valley Township, McPherson County, Kansas).  A two-manual Himers organ purchased after it was removed from a former theater.

References

External links 
Organs Made in Milwaukee: Adolph Wangerin Combines Hobby and Business
Organ Historical Society Pipe Organ Database - Wangerin Organ Co.
Aerial Age Weekly (May 6, 1918)
Wangerin Co. Turns Its Hand to War Goods

Pipe organ building companies
Musical instrument manufacturing companies of the United States
Defunct manufacturing companies based in Milwaukee